Calm with Horses is a 2019 Irish crime drama film directed by Nick Rowland in his feature debut, and written by Joseph Murtagh. It concerns an ex-boxer who works as an enforcer for a criminal family in rural Ireland while providing for his autistic son. The film stars Cosmo Jarvis, Barry Keoghan, Niamh Algar, Ned Dennehy, Kiljan Moroney and David Wilmot. It is adapted from the short story of the same name from the collection "Young Skins" by Colin Barrett. The film was released in the United States under the title The Shadow of Violence.

It had its world premiere at the Toronto International Film Festival on 8 September 2019. It was released in Ireland on 13 March 2020, by Altitude Film Distribution.

Cast
 Cosmo Jarvis as Arm
 Barry Keoghan as  Dymphna
 Niamh Algar as Ursula
 Ned Dennehy as Paudi
 Kiljan Moroney as Jack
 David Wilmot as Hector
 Anthony Welsh as Rob
 Simone Kirby as Jules

Production
In April 2018, it was announced Cosmo Jarvis, Barry Keoghan and Niamh Algar had joined the cast of the film, with Nick Rowland directing from a screenplay by Joseph Murtagh. Michael Fassbender served as an executive producer via his DMC Film banner.

Release
The film had its world premiere at the Toronto International Film Festival on 8 September 2019. It was released in Ireland on 13 March 2020 by Altitude Film Distribution. Saban Films acquired U.S. distribution rights to the film and named The Shadow Of Violence in the U.S. With this same title, it was released on VOD by Lionsgate Home Entertainment on 1 September 2020.

Reception

Box office
Calm with Horses grossed $104,946 worldwide.

Critical response
The website's critical consensus reads, "Calm with Horses presents a grimly effective portrait of one man's struggle with divided loyalties, elevated by standout performances from a stellar cast." On Metacritic, the film holds a rating of 67 out of 100, based on 14 critics, indicating "generally favorable reviews".

Accolades

See also
 2019 in film

References

External links
 
 
 

2019 films
2019 drama films
2019 directorial debut films
English-language Irish films
Irish drama films
Film4 Productions films
Saban Films films
Films about the Irish Mob
Films about organised crime in Ireland
2010s English-language films